Ben Hyne (born 7 March 1994) is an Australian rugby union footballer who currently plays as a lock or loose forward for the  in the international Super Rugby competition.

Early career
A Queenslander by birth, Hyne was raised in Rockhampton, but attended school at Downlands College in Toowoomba.   His first exposure to senior rugby was with Brothers Old Boys in the Queensland Premier Rugby competition in 2012.   During his time with Brothers, he combined rugby with work as a carpenter.

Hyne's breakthrough came in 2015 when he was selected for the  side which competed in and won that year's National Rugby Championship.   In total, he played in 9 of City's 11 games during the campaign and helped himself to 2 tries.

Hyne moved to Canberra for the 2016 season and made some great friends playing for the Tuggeranong Vikings. Second row stocks were at an all time high at the club at that time. Friendships and a healthy rivalry were key pillars of success in the Valley and Vikings were the envy of other clubs in the competition.

Super Rugby career
Hyne's strong performances as a lock for Brisbane City did not go unnoticed and he was invited to Brumbies pre-season training ahead of the 2016 Super Rugby season. There he impressed head-coach Stephen Larkham who signed him on a development contract. He was ruled out for the remainder of the season, but he had done enough to be signed to the Brumbies Extended Playing Squad for the 2017 season.

Super Rugby statistics

References

1994 births
Living people
Australian rugby union players
Rugby union locks
Rugby union flankers
Rugby union number eights
ACT Brumbies players
Brisbane City (rugby union) players
Sportspeople from Rockhampton
Sunwolves players
Canberra Vikings players
Rugby union players from Queensland
21st-century Australian people